Air-fried fries are fries cooked in an air fryer. They have thick skins with soft insides.

History 
Fred van der Weij, an inventor, was looking for a way to crisp a french fry without deep-frying them. He first tried using a convection oven, but found that this dried the french fries out. In 2005, he started to develop the air fryer. This helped companies make non-deep fried french fries.

Process 
Air-fried fries typically cook for up to 45 minutes. Air-fried french fries cook with less oil than those which are fried conventionally, which reduces the amount of calories in one serving of air-fried fries.  However, some oil is still needed to make air-fried french fries. The air-fried french fries also need to be spread out in the air-frier, otherwise the fries will steam. Air-fried fries look done before they are actually ready.

References 

French fries